Wang Xuezhen (August 1926 – 13 December 2021) was a Chinese politician who served as party secretary of Peking University from 1984 to 1991. He was an alternate member of the 12th and 13th Central Committee of the Chinese Communist Party. He was a member of the 8th National Committee of the Chinese People's Political Consultative Conference.

Biography
Wang was born in Qu County (now Longyou County), Zhejiang, in August 1926. He participated in the Chinese Communist Revolution in January 1948, and joined the Chinese Communist Party (CCP) in July of that same year. He secondary studied at Zhejiang Provincial No. 8 High School (now Quzhou No. 1 High School). In 1947, he was admitted to Peking University, majoring in law. After graduating in 1951, he stayed at the university and worked successively as president of the Student Union, director of Organization Department, and director of Academic Affairs Office. In 1966, the Cultural Revolution broke out, he was discharged and sent to the May Seventh Cadre Schools to do farm works in east China's Jiangxi province. He was reinstated in 1972 and was elevated to vice president in 1978. He was appointed party secretary, the top political position of the university, in March 1984, and served until November 1990. During his term in office, the 1989 Tiananmen Square protests and massacre broke out, on 18 May, he expressed his support for the students when he participated in the "dialogue" between the representatives of the leaders of the student movement and then Premier Li Peng at the Great Hall of the People. He died in Beijing on 13 December 2021, at the age of 95.

References

1926 births
2021 deaths
People from Quzhou
Peking University alumni
Academic staff of Peking University
People's Republic of China politicians from Zhejiang
Chinese Communist Party politicians from Zhejiang
Members of the 8th Chinese People's Political Consultative Conference
Alternate members of the 12th Central Committee of the Chinese Communist Party
Alternate members of the 13th Central Committee of the Chinese Communist Party